The 2000–01 IBLA Australia season was the first season for the team. The team played in the one and only season of the International Baseball League of Australia's Development League, All games were held on the Gold Coast at Palm Meadows with some showcase games played at Carrara Oval.

The team was made up of then current players on the Australia national baseball team. The team was coached by former Australian Baseball League player/coach of the Melbourne Monarchs and Australian Head Coach Jon Deeble with assistant Coaches Phil Dale of the former Melbourne Reds & Monarchs and Greg Jelks of the former Perth Heat.

Regular season 
The regular season consisted of 43 games, All games were played at Palm Meadows with the exception of showcase games that were played at Carrara Oval.

Standings

Record vs opponents

Game log

Postseason
All games for the 2001 postseason were played at Palm Meadows on the Gold Coast. All finals were a 1-game play-off.

Finals Series
Winners of Game 1 and 2 went into Championship games, Losers of game 1 and 2 went into a playoff for 3rd.

Game 2 2nd vs 3rd: 19 January 2001

Game 4 Championship Game: 21 January 2001

Awards

Roster

References 

IBLA Australia